Khiz Ab (also Romanized as Khīz Āb) is a village in Hamzehlu Rural District, in the Central District of Khomeyn County, Markazi Province, Iran. At the 2006 census, its population was 106, in 35 families.

References 

Populated places in Khomeyn County